The 2016 Rhode Island Rams football team represented the University of Rhode Island in the 2016 NCAA Division I FCS football season. They were led by third year head coach Jim Fleming and played their home games at Meade Stadium. They were a member of the Colonial Athletic Association. They finished the season 2–9, 1–7 in CAA play to finish in a tie for 11th place.

Schedule

Game summaries

at Kansas

Albany

at Harvard

New Hampshire

Brown

at Villanova

at Stony Brook

Maine

at James Madison

at Elon

Towson

References

Rhode Island
Rhode Island Rams football seasons
Rhode Island Rams football